Punta Sabbioni (Pronounced pun-ta sab-bee-ohnee) is a port for daily boats to Venice.

Punta Sabbioni is situated in the West Coast of Cavallino-Treporti, Italy.

The port's diameter is approx. 5.7 km (3.3 miles)

Gallery

References 

Ports and harbours of Italy